The Teatro San Angelo (in Venetian dialect) or Teatro Sant' Angelo (in Italian) was once a theatre in Venice which ran from 1677 until 1803.

It was the last of the major Venetian theatres to be built in the 1650s–60s opera craze following Teatro Santi Giovanni e Paolo in 1654, Teatro San Samuele 1655, Teatro San Salvatore 1661, Teatro San Giovanni Crisostomo in 1667.

The Teatro San Angelo was located in the Campo San[t'] Angelo, facing the Grand Canal and Rialto Bridge, on the sites of two demolished palazzi belonging to the Marcellos and Capellos. The project was completed in 1676 by Francesco Santorini, and opened in 1677 under the families of Benedetto Marcello and the Capellos.

The house was opened with the opera Helena rapita da Paride of Domenico Freschi, (1677) and continued with operas by Freschi, Gasparini, Albinoni and Bononcini. From around 1715 onwards the house was best known as the venue of many of the operas of Antonio Vivaldi. Under Vivaldi the opera house became increasingly populist and commercial. Soon theatre was home to the operas of Baldassare Galuppi, (Argenide 1733), and plays of Goldoni.

In the 1790s the Abate Pietro Chiari wrote for the Teatro San Angelo, and in 1797 Casanova wrote an attack on Chiari incurring the enmity of Antonio Condulmer, co-owner of the theatre and a member of the Council of Ten. At this point the theatre was in terminal decline.

The theatre closed in 1803 and was converted into a warehouse. It was then demolished and rebuilt as the Barocci Palazzo, today the four star Hotel NH Collection Palazzo Barocci.

Selected premieres
 The first opera of Antonio Lotti: Il trionfo dell'innocenza 1693
 Play La locandiera by Carlo Goldoni
Helena rapita da Paride Domenico Freschi, 1677
Tullia superba Domenico Freschi, 1678
La Circe Domenico Freschi, 1679
Sardanapalo Domenico Freschi, 1679
Pompeo Magno in Cilicia Domenico Freschi, 1681
Olimpia vendicata Domenico Freschi, 1681
Giulio Cesare trionfante Domenico Freschi, 1682
Silla Domenico Freschi, 1683
Apio Claudio Marco Martini, 1683
L'incoronatione di Dario Domenico Freschi, 1684
Teseo tra le rivali Domenico Freschi, 1685
Falarido tiranno d'Agrigento Giovanni Battista Bassani, 1685
Il vitio depresso e la virtù coronata di Teofilo Orgiani, 1686
Il Dioclete Teofilo Orgiani, 1687
La fortuna tra le disgratie Paolo Biagio, 1688
La Rosaura Giacomo Antonio Perti, 1689
Il trionfo dell'innocenza Antonio Lotti, 1693
Il principe selvaggio Michelangelo Gasparini, 1696
Radamisto Tomaso Albinoni, 1698
Diomede punito da Alcide Tomaso Albinoni, 1700
L'inganno innocente Tomaso Albinoni, 1701
Tiberio imperatore d'Oriente Francesco Gasparini, 1702
Giuseppe Boniventi di Giuseppe Boniventi, 1702
Farnace Antonio Caldara, 1703
Pirro Giuseppe Antonio Vincenzo Aldrovandini, 1704
Virginio consolo Antonio Giannettini, 1704
Artaserse Antonio Giannettini, 1705
Creso tolto alle fiamme Girolamo Polani, 1705
La regina creduta re Giovanni Bononcini, 1706
La fede tra gl'inganni Tomaso Albinoni, 1707
Ifiginia Agostino Bonaventura Coletti, 1707
Armida al campo Giuseppe Boniventi, 1708
L'Endimione Giuseppe Boniventi, 1709
Il tradimento premiato Girolamo Polani, 1709
Berengario re d'Italia Girolamo Polani, 1709
Circe delusa Giuseppe Boniventi, 1711
La costanza in cimento con la crudeltà Floriano Arresti, 1712
Le passioni per troppo amore Johann David Heinichen, 1713
Nerone fatto Cesare Francesco Gasparini, 1715
Rodomento sdegnato Michelangelo Gasparini, 1715
Alessandro fra le Amazoni di Fortunato Chelleri, 1715
L'amor di figlio non conosciuto di Tomaso Albinoni, 1716
Penelope la casta Fortunato Chelleri, 1717
Meleagro Tomaso Albinoni, 1718
Cleomene Tomaso Albinoni, 1718
La caduta di Gelone Giuseppe Maria Buini, 1719
Amalasunta Fortunato Chelleri, 1719
Il pentimento generoso Andrea Stefano Fiorè, 1719
Armida delusa Giuseppe Maria Buini, 1720
Filippo re Macedonia Giuseppe Boniventi e Antonio Vivaldi, 1720
Il pastor fido Carlo Luigi Pietragrua, 1721
Melinda e Tiburzio Giuseppe Maria Orlandini, 1721
La fede ne' tradimenti Carlo Luigi Pietragrua, 1721
Gli eccessi della gelosia Tomaso Albinoni, 1722
L'amor tirannico Fortunato Chelleri, 1722
Timocrate Leonardo Leo, 1723
Medea e Giasone Francesco Brusa, 1726
Gl'odelusi dal sangue Baldassare Galuppi e Giovanni Battista Pescetti, 1728
Dorinda Baldassare Galuppi e Giovanni Battista Pescetti, 1729
I tre difensori della patria Giovanni Battista Pescetti, 1729
Elenia Tomaso Albinoni, 1730
Gli sponsali d'Enea Bartolomeo Cordans, 1731
Ardelinda Tomaso Albinoni, 1732
Grullo e Moschetta Giuseppe Maria Orlandini, 1732
Alessandro nelle Indie Giovanni Battista Pescetti, 1732
L'ortolana contessa Giuseppe Maria Buini e altri, 1732
La caduta Leone, imperator d'Oriente Giuseppe Antonio Paganelli, 1732
Argenide Baldassare Galuppi, 1733
Ginestra e Lichetto Giuseppe Antonio Paganelli, 1733
L'ambizione depressa Baldassare Galuppi, 1733
Tigrane Giuseppe Antonio Paganelli, 1733
Motezuma Antonio Vivaldi, 1733
Candalide Tomaso Albinoni, 1734
Tamiri Baldassare Galuppi, 1734
Lucio Vero Francesco Araja, 1735
Elisa regina Tiro Baldassare Galuppi, 1736
Ergilda Baldassare Galuppi, 1736
Artaserse Longimano Antonio Gaetano Pampani, 1737
Ezio Giovanni Battista Lampugnani, 1737
Argenide Pietro Chiarini, 1738
Achille in Sciro Pietro Chiarini, 1739
Candaspe (Campaspe) regina de' Sciti Giovanni Battista Casali, 1740
Berenice Baldassare Galuppi, 1741
Artamene Tomaso Albinoni, 1741
Il vincitor se stesso Ignazio Fiorillo, 1741
L'impresario delle Isole Canarie Leonardo Leo, 1741
Ambleto Giuseppe Carcani, 1742
Armida Ferdinando Bertoni, 1746
La caduta d'Amulio Antonio Gaetano Pampani, 1746
Scipione nelle Spagne Baldassare Galuppi, 1746
Il re dispietato Giuseppe Maria Buini, 1747
Tigrane Giovanni Battista Lampugnani, 1747
L'Arcadia in Brenta Baldassare Galuppi, 1749
Amor contadino Giovanni Battista Lampugnani, 1760
Amore in caricatura Vincenzo Legrenzio Ciampi, 1761
L'amore artigiano Gaetano Latilla, 1761
Siface Domenico Fischietti, 1761
Li scherzi d'amore Francesco Maggiore, 1762
Tieste Ugo Foscolo, 1797
Riverente gratulazione per le glorie Francesco II Francesco Gardi, 1799
Il medico a suo dispetto, ossia La muta per amore Francesco Gardi, 1800
Il carretto del venditore d'aceto Johann Simon Mayr, 1800
La casa da vendere Giuseppe Antonio Capuzzi or Francesco Gardi, 1804

See also
Opera houses and theatres of Venice

References

Theatres in Venice
San Angelo
1677 establishments in Italy
1803 disestablishments in Italy
Demolished buildings and structures in Italy